The episodes of the Japanese anime television series Speed Grapher are directed by Kunihisa Sugishima, animated by Gonzo, and produced by TV Asahi. Speed Grapher has been adapted into a manga and a light novel. The series tells the story of former war photographer Tatsumi Saiga and his quest to save Kagura Tennōzu from Chōji Suitengu and the members of the fetish club, Roppongi Club. Kagura, the club's "goddess", can transform people into Euphorics, or people with their desired abilities granted, through her bodily fluids.

The series initially aired on TV Asahi between April 8, 2005 and September 30, 2005 in Japan. Sony Pictures Entertainment released the series to twelve DVD compilations, each featuring two episodes, between July 2005 and June 2006 in Japan for Region 2.

In the United States, Speed Grapher is licensed to Funimation. Funimation released Speed Grapher to Region 1 to six DVD compilations, each containing four episodes, between July 2006 and March 2007. In addition, several "Limited Edition" DVDs were released on the same dates as the regular DVDs. On March 11, 2008, a box set containing all six of the previously released DVDs was released. On February 13, 2007, Funimation released the series to the iTunes USA store. On December 9, 2007, Independent Film Channel announced that it had licensed Speed Grapher for airing on TV from Funimation. The series aired between March 7 and August 15, 2008 in the United States.

Speed Grapher was also released to DVD in Region 2 for the United Kingdom by MVM Films between April 16, 2007 and February 4, 2008.

Each episode uses two pieces of theme music: one opening theme and one of two closing themes. "Girls on Film" by Duran Duran serves as the opening for all of the episodes. Episodes one through twelve use , by Shione Yukawa, as the ending theme, while episodes thirteen through twenty-four use "Break the Cocoon" by Yorico as the ending theme. Funimation was unable to obtain the rights for "Girls on Film" in the United States, however. The opening theme for the English episodes is "Shutter Speed" by Shinkichi Mitsumune.


Episode list

References

Speed Grapher